The Messianic Jewish Alliance of America (MJAA) was founded in 1915 as the Hebrew Christian Alliance of America, changing its name in 1975. It follows on from the International Hebrew Christian Alliance between the Hebrew Christian Alliance of Great Britain and that of America.

As to belief, Messianic Jews believe in Jesus Christ (Yeshuah) as their Messiah, nevertheless they continue to perceive themselves as Jews, e.g. by continuing to celebrate Jewish customs. For Messianic Jews, the Bible, the Old Testament (Tanakh) as well as the New Testament (especially the four Gospels), forms the basis of their faith. They are convinced that the Bible in its entirety is inspired by God. They further believe that one day all Jews will be Messianic Jews and that they will lead all of Israel, the Jews, and the gentile Christian world in worship of the one true God, understanding this to be the Messianic Age.

History
The Hebrew Christian Alliance of America began in the early 19th century as a mission by Hebrew Christians to other Jews. Various independent efforts were united at the Hebrew Christian Alliance of the United States in 1905, in partnership with Hebrew Christian Alliances of other countries, most notably the Hebrew Christian Alliance of Great Britain founded by Carl Schwartz 1866. The organization was under the sponsorship of Philip Milledoler of the Reformed Dutch Church.  Their efforts led to the formation in December 1816 of the first American Christian mission to Jews, which was incorporated on April 14, 1820 as the American Society for Meliorating the Condition of the Jews.  There were, however, few Jews in the US at the time, and the organization was run by Christian leaders of a variety of denominations.

Youth organization 
The Young Messianic Jewish Alliance (YMJA) is a national organization for members of the Messianic Jewish Alliance of America between 13 and 30 years old.

See also
 Church's Ministry Among Jewish People (CMJ), Anglican body, formerly the London Jews' Society.
 Hebrew Christian movement, description of various 19th-century bodies and individuals.

References

External links 
Messianic Jewish Alliance of America.
Young Messianic Jewish Alliance
MJAA Messianic Conferences
 The Joseph Project - Humanitarian aid to Israel.
International Alliance of Messianic Congregations and Synagogues - Congregation directory.
Messianic Jewish Fellowship International

Christian denominations established in the 20th century
Conversion of Jews to Christianity
Messianic Judaism
Christian organizations established in 1915